James Omonigho Igbekeme (born 4 July 1995) is a Nigerian footballer who plays as a left winger for Polish club Wisła Kraków, on loan from Spanish club Real Zaragoza.

Club career
Born in Lagos, Igbekeme made his senior debut with Campeonato Nacional de Seniores side G.D. Ribeirão in the 2013–14 season. In 2015, he moved to fellow league team U.D. Oliveirense.

In June 2017, Igbekeme signed for LigaPro side Gil Vicente F.C. He made his professional debut on 6 August, starting and scoring the winner in a 2–1 away defeat of FC Porto B.

On 28 October 2017, Igbekeme scored a brace in a 4–0 home routing of S.L. Benfica B. He finished the campaign with five goals in 32 appearances, but his side eventually suffered relegation.

On 12 June 2018, Igbekeme signed a four-year deal with Segunda División side Real Zaragoza. Initially a regular starter, he gradually started to feature more sparingly, mainly due to injuries.

On 26 January 2022, Igbekeme was loaned to Major League Soccer side Columbus Crew until December.

References

External links

1995 births
Living people
Sportspeople from Lagos
Nigerian footballers
Association football wingers
Association football forwards
Liga Portugal 2 players
Campeonato de Portugal (league) players
Segunda División players
Major League Soccer players
G.D. Ribeirão players
U.D. Oliveirense players
Gil Vicente F.C. players
Real Zaragoza players
Columbus Crew players
Wisła Kraków players
Nigerian expatriate footballers
Nigerian expatriate sportspeople in Portugal
Nigerian expatriate sportspeople in Spain
Nigerian expatriate sportspeople in the United States
Nigerian expatriate sportspeople in Poland
Expatriate footballers in Portugal
Expatriate footballers in Spain
Expatriate soccer players in the United States
Expatriate footballers in Poland